DZIM (98.3 FM), broadcasting as 98.3 Spirit FM, is a radio station owned and operated by the Diocese of Masbate. Its studios & transmitter are located beside the Masbate Cathedral, Quezon St., Brgy. Centro, Masbate City. The station simulcasted on cable via Charles Cable Channel 31.

References

Radio stations established in 2010
Catholic radio stations